Lesbian, gay, bisexual, and transgender (LGBT) people in Thailand face legal challenges not experienced by non-LGBT residents. Both male and female same-sex sexual activity are legal in Thailand, but same-sex couples and households headed by same-sex couples are not eligible for the same legal protections available to opposite-sex couples. About eight percent of the Thai population, five million people, are thought to be in the LGBT demographic.

In 2013, the Bangkok Post said that "while Thailand is viewed as a tourist haven for same-sex couples, the reality for locals is that the law, and often public sentiment, is not so liberal." A 2014 report by the United States Agency for International Development and the United Nations Development Programme said that LGBT people "still face discrimination affecting their social rights and job opportunities", and "face difficulty gaining acceptance for non-traditional sexuality, even though the tourism authority has been promoting Thailand as a gay-friendly country".

Changes in attitudes and public policy towards LGBT issues began to occur in Thailand during the 1990s and, in particular, the early part of the 21st century. In 2015, Thailand enacted a comprehensive anti-discrimination law, which covered sexual orientation and gender identity. As of 2022, a group of bills is being considered in the Thai parliament that will grant either civil partnerships or full marriage for same-sex couples.

In 2017, Bangkok was named the second-most gay-friendly city in Asia, after Tel Aviv, Israel, due to its LGBT dating scene, nightlife, openness and safety. The Tourism Authority of Thailand has launched a global project entitled "Go Thai Be Free", to encourage LGBTQ+ tourists from around the world and raise its international profile as an LGBTQ+ friendly country.

Legality of same-sex sexual activity
Private, adult, consensual, and non-commercial sodomy was decriminalized in Thailand in 1956. However, same-sex attraction and transgender identities were still seen as socially unacceptable. Through the Penal Code Amendment Act of 1997, the age of consent was set at fifteen years regardless of gender or sexual orientation.

In 2002, the Ministry of Health announced that homosexuality would no longer be regarded as a mental illness or disorder.

In 2007, the Thai Government expanded the definition of a sexual assault and rape victim to include both women and men. The government also prohibited marital rape, with the law stipulating that women or men can be victims.

Recognition of same-sex relationships and marriage

Thailand does not recognize same-sex marriages, civil unions, domestic partnerships, unregistered cohabitations, or any other form of same-sex unions.

In September 2011, the National Human Rights Commission (NHRC) and the Sexual Diversity Network, an NGO, proposed draft legislation on same-sex marriage and sought the Thai Government's support for the law. Instead, in December 2012, the Government formed a committee to draft legislation providing legal recognition for same-sex couples in the form of civil partnerships. On 8 February 2013, the Rights and Liberties Protection Department and the Parliament's Committee on Legal Affairs, Justice, and Human Rights held a first public hearing on the civil partnership bill, drafted by the committee's chairman, Police General Viroon Phuensaen.

In September 2013, the Bangkok Post reported that an attempt in 2011 by Natee Teerarojjanapong, president of the Gay Political Group of Thailand, to register a marriage certificate with his male partner had been rejected.

By 2014, the civil partnership bill had bipartisan support, but was stalled due to political unrest in the country. In the second half of 2014, reports emerged that a draft bill called the "Civil Partnership Act" would be submitted to the junta-appointed Thai Parliament. It would give couples some of the rights of heterosexual marriage, but was criticized for increasing the minimum age from 17 to 20 and omitting adoption rights.

Thai opinion polls have consistently favoured legal recognition of same-sex marriages.

In 2017, Thai government officials responded favourably to a petition signed by 60,000 people calling for civil partnerships for same-sex couples. Pitikan Sithidej, director-general of the Rights and Liberties Protection Department at the Justice Ministry, confirmed she had received the petition and would do all she could to get it passed as soon as possible. The Justice Ministry convened on 4 May 2018 to begin discussions on a draft civil partnership bill, titled the "Same Sex Life Partnership Registration Bill". Under the proposal, same-sex couples would be able to register themselves as "life partners" and will be granted some of the rights of marriage. The bill was discussed in public hearings between 12 and 16 November, where a reported 98% expressed support for the measure. On 25 December 2018, the Cabinet approved the bill.

On 8 July 2020, the Cabinet approved a new draft of the bill. It will now be introduced in the National Assembly.

In June 2020, Move Forward Party deputy Tunyawat Kamolwongwat introduced a bill to legalize same-sex marriage. The public consultation on the bill was launched on 2 July.

In 2021, the Constitutional Court ruled that Section 1448 of the Civil and Commercial Code interpreting marriages as only between women and men is constitutional, but after the release of full ruling, one phrase mentioned that members of the LGBTQ community cannot reproduce, as it is against nature, and they are unlike other animals with unusual behaviours or physical characteristics. The verdict cites LGBTQ as a different "species" that needs to be separated and studied as it is incapable of creating the "delicate bond" of human relationships. The text was criticised by the LGBT community as homophobic and politically incorrect.

In 2022, a group of bills concerning same-sex unions passed their first readings in the Thai parliament. These include the Marriage Equality Bill proposed by the opposition Move Forward Party, which would amend the current marriage law to include couples of any gender, and the government-proposed Civil Partnership Bill, which would instead introduce civil partnerships as a separate category, granting some but not all rights given to married couples.

On 14 February 2023, Bangkok's Dusit district became the first jurisdiction in Thailand to issue partnership certificates, which are legally non-binding, to same-sex couples.

Adoption and parenting
Only married couples may adopt in Thailand with the exception of single women, who are allowed to petition for the adoption of a special-needs child (Thai law on what qualifies a child as special-needs remain unclear). The draft legislation working its way through the Thai bureaucracy in late 2018 would ensure only property and inheritance rights and some other rights of same-sex couples, but not their rights to public welfare, tax benefits or child adoption.

Thailand had long been a popular destination for surrogacy arrangements. In 2015, however, the Thai Parliament passed a law banning foreigners from travelling to Thailand to have commercial surrogacy arrangements. Only married couples as Thai residents are allowed to make commercial surrogacy contracts. In vitro fertilisation (IVF) is restricted to married couples.

Discrimination protections

None of the various Thai constitutions has mentioned sexual orientation or gender identity. Natee Theerarojnapong, of the Human Rights Commission, and Anjana Suvarnananda, a lesbian rights advocate, campaigned unsuccessfully for the inclusion of "sexual identity" in the Interim Constitution of 2006 and the Constitution of 2007. The 2007 Constitution did contain a broad prohibition of "unfair discrimination" based on "personal status" and promises to respect various civil liberties in accordance with "state security" and "public morality".

The Gender Equality Act B.E. 2558 was passed on 13 March 2015 and came into force on 9 September 2015. This act bans discrimination based on gender identity and sexual orientation, and was the first law in Thailand to contain language mentioning LGBT people. Under the law, discrimination against a male, female or "a person who has a sexual expression different from that person's original sex" is punishable by up to six months in prison and a fine of up to 20,000 baht. However, the law specified an exception for "education, religion and the public interest", which was strongly criticised by women's rights groups.

Gender identity and expression
Sex reassignment operations have been performed in Thailand since 1975, and Thailand is among the most popular destinations globally for patients seeking such operations.

Transgender people are quite common in Thai popular entertainment, television shows and nightclub performances, however, transgender people lack various legal rights compared to the rest of the population, and may face discrimination from society.

Transgender people face substantial barriers to employment, including full-time work, executive positions or promotions, according to 2015 research for the International Labour Organization. Discrimination in job applications also often discourages transgender people from seeking further employment opportunities or entering the job market. The research also found that they are faced with "daily discrimination and humiliation" which often cuts short their careers. An editorial in the Bangkok Post in 2013 noted that "we don't find transgenders as high-ranking officials, doctors, lawyers, scientists, or teachers in state-run schools and colleges. Nor as executives in the corporate world. In short, the doors of government agencies and large corporations are still closed to transgender women."

In 2007, the Thai National Assembly debated allowing transgender people to legally change their names after having a sex change operation. Post-operation male-to-female transgender government employees are not granted the right to wear female uniforms at work, and are still expected to perform military service. Specific cases of inequality include a hospital which refused to allow a transgender woman to stay in a woman's ward, even though she had undergone sex reassignment surgery.

In 2014, a Matthayom 1 textbook was criticized for discrimination and lack of gender sensitivity, due to a description of transgender people as suffering from gender confusion, khon long phet (คนหลงเพศ), and illustrations in the textbook featuring performances by transgender dancers. Critics argued that the word long (หลง: 'confused') had negative connotations, and that "transgender" or kham phet (ข้ามเพศ) was more suitable. It was reported that officials at the Ministry of Education would investigate the matter.

In July 2019, a proposal to regulate sex changes for transgender individuals was presented to the National Assembly. Among others, the proposed bill would allow those who have undergone sex reassignment surgery to change their legal gender on official documents. It also covers name changes, marriage rights and military conscription.

Military service
In 2005, the Thai Armed Forces lifted their ban on LGBT people serving in the military. Prior to this reform, LGBT people were exempted as suffering from a "mental disorder".

Blood donation
In May 2009, the Thai Red Cross reaffirmed its ban of men who have sex with men (MSM) becoming blood donors, despite campaigns to change this policy.

Living conditions

LGBT lexicon

The Thai word for "gay" or "queer" is เกย์. The term katoey or kathoey refers to transgender women or effeminate gay men. Thai society perceives kathoeys as belonging to a third gender alongside male and female. The term dee (ดี้) alludes to homosexual or bisexual women. Thai has also adopted the word "lesbian" from English:.

The Thai language recognises several other gender and sexual identities, including tom (ทอม), from the English "tomboy", which refers to women who dress, act, and speak in a masculine fashion. Toms are not necessarily lesbian or bisexual, but may be perceived as such by others. Other identities include angees, kathoeys who are attracted to toms, and adams, men who are attracted to toms.

Homophobia and violence
In 2016, Paisarn Likhitpreechakul, a board member of the Sogi Foundation, wrote an op-ed in the Bangkok Post warning of so-called corrective rape being widely used to "cure" lesbians of their sexual orientation, highlighting the case of a father in Loei who confessed to raping his 14-year-old daughter for four years to stop her from socialising with tomboys. Paisarn expressed further concern that such practices were being normalised in Thai society, and that the true number of such cases was far higher, as many murders of Thai LGBTs are categorised as crimes of passion, because the Thai legal system does not include the concept of "hate crimes". The United Nations Office of the High Commissioner for Human Rights identified murder, beatings, kidnappings, rape and sexual assault against LGBT people as examples of homophobic and transphobic violence and noted that violence against LGBT people "tends to be especially vicious compared to other bias-motivated crimes".

Education
On 26 December 1996, in a report in the Bangkok Post, the Rajabat Institute Council, the collective governing body of all of Thailand's colleges, declared that it would bar homosexuals from enrolling in any of its teacher training schools, the idea of Deputy Education Minister Suraporn Danaitangtrakul. The announcement was strongly criticised by human rights groups and many others, who urged the repeal of the policy. On 25 January 1997, Danaitangtrakul proposed that the Institute set new criteria to bar people with "improper personalities", but not specific groups such as homosexuals.

Prisons 
For several years, the official policy of Thai prisons has been to respect and recognize sexual diversity, placing inmates in cells based on their stated gender and sexual orientation. Homosexual male prisoners, like all male prisoners, have their heads shaved. Female inmates are not allowed to wear make-up, but gay male inmates are. According to the Department of Corrections, there were 4,448 LGBT prisoners in the country in 2016. Of these, 1,804 were katoey (transgender women or effeminate gay men), 352 were gay (เกย์), 1,247 were tom (ทอม; female with masculine characteristics), 1,011 were dee (ดี้; female homosexual with feminine characteristics), and 34 were male-to-female transgender people.

Politics

Ahead of the 2019 general election, several political parties expressed support for same-sex marriage and LGBT rights. The Future Forward Party called for the legalisation of same-sex marriage and amendments to the official school curriculum "so that it no longer propagates stereotypes and prejudice against the LGBTQ community". The Mahachon Party, the Thai Local Power Party, the Polamuang Thai Party, the Thai Liberal Party, the Puea Chat Party, the Commoners' Party and the Democrat Party all expressed support for same-sex marriage. The Pheu Thai Party, the largest party in Parliament, also supports same-sex marriage. The Thai Raksa Chart Party, banned in March 2019 due to the involvement of Princess Ubol Ratana, stated that it supported civil partnerships for same-sex couples.

In March 2019, transgender filmmaker Tanwarin Sukkhapisit of the Future Forward Party was elected to the Thai Parliament, becoming its first ever transgender MP. Three other transgender candidates from the same party, Tunyawaj Kamonwongwat, Nateepat Kulsetthasith, and Kawinnath Takey, were also elected.

LGBT life 

Thailand has long had a reputation of tolerance when it comes to LGBT people; there are many LGBT nightclubs and bars in the country and the first Thai LGBT magazine, Mithuna, began publication in 1983.

However, in 1989, LGBT activist Natee Teerarojjanapongs described the situation as more complicated; although LGBT citizens do not face direct repression from the state, instead "it is a question of subtle negation through invisibility and a lack of social awareness about homosexual people", and although people acknowledge the existence of homosexuality, "they are still not used to the idea of openly gay people. Even fewer have any understanding of the notion of lesbian and gay rights".

This began to change in the 1990s with more public events, such as LGBT pride festivals that were held every year from 1999 to 2007 in Bangkok, until internal disputes within the LGBT community and arguments with the festival's financial backers prevented future events from being held. Bangkok Pride was expected to take place again in November 2017, the first time in 11 years, but was postponed due to the national one year mourning period for King Bhumibol Adulyadej.

In the city of Phuket, pride events have been held annually since 1999. The second parade in the northern city of Chiang Mai in 2009 stirred such hostility that it had to be canceled. As participants were preparing to march, a local political group surrounded the compound where they had gathered, shouting insults through megaphones and throwing fruit and rocks at the building. However, ten years later, more than 500 people including some politicians marched in the Chiang Mai Pride parade on 21 February 2019.

Songkran is the Thai New Year's national holiday. Songkran falls on 13 April every year, but the holiday period extends from 14 to 15 April. It has taken on particular meaning in recent years for LGBT residents and visitors, as it is held simultaneously to the Songkran Bangkok Gay Circuit Party, considered the largest such gay celebration in Asia. The event celebrated its 14th anniversary in 2019.

Media 

Since the 1980s, many LGBT-themed publications have been available in Thailand. LGBT characters in Thai films have also been common since the 1970s, often as comic relief, although it was not until the new wave of Thai cinema in the late 1990s that Thai films began to examine LGBT characters and issues in more depth.

Censorship does not affect LGBT-related media directly, but pornography and sex toys are illegal in Thailand.

Demographics
According to 2018 estimates from LGBT Capital, there were about 4.2 million LGBT people in Thailand.

Public opinion
According to a 2015 opinion poll, 89% of Thais would accept a colleague who is gay or lesbian, 80% would not mind if a family member was LGBT, and 59% were in favour of legalizing same-sex marriage.

According to a 2019 YouGov poll of 1,025 respondents, 63% of Thais supported the legalisation of same-sex partnerships, with 11% against and 27% preferring not to answer. 69% of people aged 18 to 34 supported civil partnerships, with 10% opposed. Legalisation was supported by 56% of those aged between 35 and 54 (33% opposed), and 55% of those aged 55 and over (13% opposed). 66% of those with university degrees were in favour (10% opposed), and 57% of those without university degrees (12% opposed). 68% of those with a high income supported civil partnerships (7% opposed), and 55% of those with a low income (13% opposed). 68% of women responded in favour (7% opposed), and 57% of men (14% opposed).

Summary table

See also 

LGBT history in Thailand
Human rights in Thailand
LGBT rights in Asia
Kathoey
Anjaree

References 

Discrimination against transgender people
Law of Thailand
Thailand
Human rights in Thailand
Kathoey
LGBT rights in Thailand